The NAS (National Airways System) Air King was a US light biplane transport aircraft designed in 1926 to carry three passengers in two open cockpits. Only one was built but in 1928 it was revised to carry two passengers and was more successful, with over twenty produced.

Design and development

The Air King Model 26 was a single bay biplane with wings of rectangular plan, though with rounded, steel tube tips. The rest of the wing structure was a mixture of spruce and ash, with all wing surfaces fabric-covered. Because its upper and lower wings were interchangeable, the span of the upper one was only about 90% that of the lower, the latter mounted on the lower fuselage. Only the lower wing was set with dihedral (2.5°). Ailerons on upper and lower wings were externally interconnected though, unusually, port and starboard pairs could be separately controlled.

The fuselage was a fabric-covered, trussed steel tube structure with the readily available Curtiss OX-5 water-cooled V-8 under a rather pointed cowling in the nose. Its honeycomb radiator was mounted under the upper wing. There were two wide, open cockpits, each with a bench seat for two. The tail surfaces were very angular and constructed from dural, with a tailplane externally braced to the fin and fuselage. Its control surfaces were broad chord; the elevators had a deep cut-out for rudder movement.

The Air King's fixed undercarriage was conventional for its time, its wheels on a single axle mounted on short, vertical legs with trailing drag struts attached to the lower fuselage and a rear tailskid.

The date of the Air King's first flight in uncertain but it had been completed by January 1927. No more four-seaters were built but in early 1928 the prototype reappeared as the Model 28 with a smaller rear cockpit seating only the pilot. The engine cowling was cleaned up, totally enclosing the OX-5, and the cabane struts revised with a forward single strut and a transverse V aft on each side. It had a wider track, split axle undercarriage with longer main legs from mid-fuselage. The vertical tail was also modified, with the external bracing removed and a rounded fin and rudder. It was  shorter but its other dimensions were unchanged, as, largely, was the performance. Slightly cheaper, this two passenger version proved more popular and twenty-three were completed.

Variants

Model 26 1926 first prototype, three passengers.
Model 28 1928 two passenger version with cleaned-up engine cowling and new, two axle wider track undercarriage. 23 built.

Specifications (Air King Model 26)

References

Single-engined tractor aircraft
Biplanes
1920s United States civil aircraft